Holmes Family Effect is a Canadian reality television series, which premiered on February 7, 2021 on CTV. Hosted by Mike Holmes with his children Mike Holmes Jr. and Sherry Holmes, the series features the trio working with service organizations seeking to redesign and improve their working spaces.

Mike Holmes' first show for CTV after years of being associated primarily with HGTV Canada, the series premiered on February 7, 2021 following Super Bowl LV. The series has also been acquired by Fox for broadcast in the United States later in 2021. The series aired on March 16, 2021 and March 23, 2021 for 2 hours on Fox.

Episodes

References

External links
 
Official FOX site

The Holmes Group
Home renovation television series
2020s Canadian reality television series
2021 Canadian television series debuts
CTV Television Network original programming